The Missouri Legislative Black Caucus, Inc. (MLBC) is an organization representing African American members of the Missouri Senate and Missouri House of Representatives. African American members of Missouri’s 75th General Assembly (1969-1970) formally established the Missouri Legislative Black Caucus. The current Chair is Representative Marlene Terry, St. Louis County, MO and the Executive Director is Cheryl Dozier.

Current members 
Senator Steve Roberts
Senator Brian Williams
Senator Barbara Anne Washington
Senator Karla May
Senator Angela Walton Mosley
Representative Marlene Terry, Chair
Representative Michael Johnson , Vice-Chair
Representative Yolonda Fountain Henderson, Secretary
Representative Mark A. Sharp, Treasurer
Representative Marlon Anderson
Representative Kevin Windham Jr.
Representative LaKeySha Frazier Bosley
Representative Delbret Taylor
Representative Joe Adams
Representative David Tyson Smith
Representative Alan Gray
Representative Ashley Bland Manlove
Representative Jay Mosley
Representative Chantelle Nickson Clark
Representative Jerome Barnes
Representative Kimberly Ann Collins
Representative Rasheen Aldridge 
Representative Richard Brown
Representative Anthony Ealy
Representative Jamie Johnson
Representative Yolanda Young

References

External links

State Legislative Black Caucuses
Missouri General Assembly